Blight is an English surname. Notable people with this surname include:

People with the surname
 David W. Blight (born 1949), American historian
 Digby Blight (born 1931), former Director of Premier and Cabinet, Western Australia
 Ellen Blight (1833/1834–1850), English lion-tamer killed by a tiger
 John Blight (1913–1995), Australian poet of Cornish ancestry
 John Thomas Blight (1835–1911), Cornish archaeological artist
 Malcolm Blight (born 1950), former Australian rules footballer
 Rick Blight (1955–2005), Canadian hockey player
 Vicki Blight (born 1981), British radio DJ

Fictional characters
 Dr. Blight, a villain in the animated series Captain Planet and the Planeteers
 Amity Blight, character in The Owl House

English-language surnames